Zhang Ying (born 28 July 1963) is a former synchronised swimmer from China.

References 

1963 births
Living people
Chinese synchronized swimmers
Olympic synchronized swimmers of China
Synchronized swimmers at the 1988 Summer Olympics
Synchronized swimmers from Beijing